The  New York Giants season was the franchise's 90th season in the National Football League (NFL), the fifth playing their home games at MetLife Stadium and the eleventh under head coach Tom Coughlin. The team failed to improve on their 7–9 mark from 2013, finishing 6–10.

To commemorate their ninetieth anniversary, the Giants wore a special patch on their jerseys. In addition, the team wore white pants instead of gray for two home games versus the Indianapolis Colts in Week 9 on Monday Night Football and two weeks later against the San Francisco 49ers. With their loss to the Jaguars on November 30, 2014, the Giants sealed their second consecutive losing season.

The Giants' 2014 season was plagued by a 7-game losing streak in the middle of the season, their longest since 2004 and a league-leading 22 players on the injured reserve list, including star wide receiver Victor Cruz, by the end of the season.

Draft

Notes
 The Giants traded their seventh-round selection (No. 225 overall) to the Carolina Panthers in exchange for linebacker Jon Beason.

Staff

Final roster

Schedule

Preseason

Regular season

Note: Intra-division opponents are in bold text.

Game summaries

Week 1: at Detroit Lions

The Lions routed the Giants 35-14.  With the loss, the Giants opened the season with an 0-1 record.

Week 2: vs. Arizona Cardinals

Week 3: vs. Houston Texans

Week 4: at Washington Redskins

This would be the Giants largest margin of victory since their 42-7 win over the Eagles in 2012. It was also head coach Tom Coughlin's 100th win as coach of the Giants.

Week 5: vs. Atlanta Falcons

Rookie Odell Beckham Jr. would record his 1st NFL touchdown in this game.

Week 6: at Philadelphia Eagles

The Giants were dominated from start to finish as the Eagles routed them 27-0.  It was only the second time this season that an NFL team failed to score in a game (the Jets were shut out 31-0 in Week 5 against the Chargers).  The loss snapped the Giants' 3 game winning streak as their overall record fell to 3-3.

Week 7: at Dallas Cowboys

Larry Donnell had 2 fumbles in the second half, and the defense wasn't able to stop Tony Romo.

Week 9: vs. Indianapolis Colts

On the night the Giants added Michael Strahan to the Ring of Honor, they got blown out by the Colts. They fell to 3-5 and lost their third game in a row.

Week 10: at Seattle Seahawks

The Seahawks outscored the Giants 21-0 in the fourth quarter. The 3-6 Giants playoff hopes were now in jeopardy.

Week 11: vs. San Francisco 49ers

The Giants had many opportunities to win this game handily, but couldn't move past Eli Manning's 5 interceptions.

Week 12: vs. Dallas Cowboys

This was the first Sunday Night Football game held in MetLife Stadium following a one-season absence.

With the loss, the Giants fell to 3-8, and were mathematically eliminated from playoff contention after the Lions defeated the Bears on Thanksgiving four days later. This game, however, is best known for an acrobatic one-handed catch by Odell Beckham Jr. early in the 2nd quarter that would go down as one of the greatest catches in NFL history.  A penalty marker flew as he made the catch - for pass interference on Brandon Carr, who had been covering Beckham on that play. The catch was also the Giants 3,000th touchdown in franchise history, including postseason play.

Week 13: at Jacksonville Jaguars

The Giants squandered a 21-0 lead they had midway through the second quarter and went on to lose 25-24 to fall to 3-9, matching their loss total from 2013.

Week 14: at Tennessee Titans

With the blowout victory over a woeful Titans team, the Giants improved to 4-9 and snapped a 7-game losing streak. The Giants beat the Titans for the first time since they moved to Tennessee.

Week 15: vs. Washington Redskins

Odell Beckham Jr. scored 3 touchdowns in the win. The Giants improved to 5-9.

Week 16: at St. Louis Rams

In this game, Odell Beckham Jr. broke Giants' franchise records for most receptions by a rookie and most receiving yards by a rookie, previously set by Jeremy Shockey in 2002. Beckham also topped 1,000 yards receiving for the season. In both cases, this was achieved despite Beckham missing the first four games of the season. This game was also infamous for a benches-clearing brawl in the second quarter.

Because the Rams moved to Los Angeles in 2016, this is the last time the Giants played in St. Louis.

Week 17: vs. Philadelphia Eagles

With the loss, the Giants finished the season 6-10 and were swept by the Eagles for the first time since 2010.  Also, their record against the Eagles fell to 3-11 dating back to 2008.

Standings

Division

Conference

References

New York Giants
New York Giants seasons
New York Giants season
21st century in East Rutherford, New Jersey
Meadowlands Sports Complex